The Jazz Modes is an album by horn player Julius Watkins and saxophonist Charlie Rouse recorded in 1957 and 1958 and released on the Atlantic label.

Reception
The AllMusic review by Michael G. Nastos awarded the album 4 stars and stated: "This, just short of 40 total minutes of bold, jazz-based creative sounds, is definitely recommended."

Track listing
All compositions by Julius Watkins except as indicated
 "The Oblong" - 5:43
 "1-2-3-4-0 in Syncopation" - 3:52
 "Blue Flame" - 4:02
 "Mood in Motion" - 5:38
 "Knittin'" (Charlie Rouse) - 6:24
 "This 'N' That" (Rouse) - 5:28
 "Glad That I Found You" - 2:37
 "Princess" - 4:35

Personnel
Julius Watkins - French horn
Charlie Rouse - tenor saxophone
Sahib Shihab - baritone saxophone (tracks 1, 2, 4 & 6)
Gildo Mahones - piano 
Martin Rivera - bass
Ron Jefferson (tracks 3, 5, 7 & 8), Jimmy Wormworth (tracks 1, 2, 4 & 6) - drums
Chino Pozo - congas, bongos  (tracks 3, 5, 7 & 8)
Eileen Gilbert - vocals (tracks 3, 7 & 8)

References

Atlantic Records albums
Charlie Rouse albums
Julius Watkins albums
1959 albums
Albums produced by Nesuhi Ertegun